Omar Radi is a Moroccan investigative journalist and human rights activist. He has worked at Lakome, Atlantic Radio, Media 24, TelQuel and Le Desk and volunteered for the citizen media Mamfakinch, focusing on investigations about human rights, corruption and social movements. He was detained in Casablanca on 26 December 2019 for criticizing a judge in a tweet posted six months earlier. His arrest triggered a movement of solidarity among his sympathizers. He was handed a suspended four-month prison sentence, a verdict criticized by some NGOs and human rights groups.

Career 
Radi has worked on anti-competition practices by Mounir Majidi; corruption among politicians and members of parliament; budgetary problems in the urgent education program; a 2018 documentary about the Hirak Rif Movement; and coverage of social movements in Sidi Ifni, Imidir and Rif.

2019 Arrest 
On 26 December 2019, Omar Radi was summoned to the local police station in Casablanca where he was arrested. The official reason given for his arrest was that—in April 2019, more than 6 months before his arrest—Radi tweeted critically of a Casablanca magistrate for delivering 20-years jail sentence of 42 activists, including Nasser Zefzafi, from the Hirak Rif Movement. In an interview with Amy Goodman on Democracy Now!, Radi stated that he believed he was arrested because he was at a journalism awards ceremony in Algeria 3 days prior to his incarceration, speaking to the public about the Moroccan political economy and what he described as "economic predation" in Morocco and a "state capture model of economy."

The National union for journalists asked for his release. The Moroccan Association for Human Rights (AMDH) condemned the arrest. Human Rights Watch asked the authorities for his release and praised his quality journalism. On 29 September 2019, protests took place in front of the parliament. Protesters took the streets calling for his release in the Moroccan cities of Casablanca, Rabat, and Agadir but also abroad in Paris and Brussels.

On 31 December 2019,  Moroccan authorities released him on bail following a campaign in his support, two days before his judgement, due on 2 January 2020. The judgement was then postponed to 5 March 2020.

2020 Cellphone Surveillance 
In June 2020, Amnesty International reported it had found evidence that Omar Radi's personal cellphone had been infected with the Pegasus spyware of the Israeli technology firm NSO Group. The program can covertly access a phone’s camera, microphone, text messages, emails, applications, and location. As NSO Group publicly states that it sells its software exclusively to governments, Amnesty International concluded in its report that the surveillance was conducted by Moroccan authorities. Israel classifies this technology as a weapon and its approval is required for any exports.

Moroccan authorities challenged what they called these "serious and tendentious charges" by Amnesty International. The human rights group said its reporting provided the necessary proof, arguing in a 4 July statement that "the technology used to spy on Omar Radi's phone required the control over telephone operators, which only the government could exert in order to hack the Internet connection." The Moroccan authorities maintain that what Amnesty provided does not constitute "convincing scientific evidence."

2020 Arrest and Imprisonment 
On 25 June and 2 July, authorities summoned Radi to appear before the National Judicial Police Brigade for questioning. On 2 July, the Moroccan website Le 360 accused Omar Radi of being a "British intelligence agent." The French newspaper le Monde reported that the Moroccan justice system suspects him of receiving "financial support from abroad" and having "links with a liaison officer from a foreign country" who has allegedly been "under diplomatic cover since 1979 in several regions of tension" throughout the world. Omar Radi categorically denies these accusations.

On the night of 5 July, police arrested  Radi and his colleague at Le Desk, Imad Stitou, were taken into police custody after an altercation with a cameraman from Chouf TV, a sensationalist Moroccan media agency, who—according to Le Desk—had been following Radi since 25 June and had come to harass them. According to a spokesperson for the General Directorate for National Security, Radi was taken into custody for "public drunkenness and violence." Both journalists were detained overnight and released on 6 June, pending  an investigation into allegations of "public intoxication, violence, insult, and filming without permission," according to court documents.

Police again detained Radi 29 July "on espionage and other charges that seem backed by scant evidence," the U.S.-based human rights organization Human Rights Watch reported. It reported Radi was being held at the Oukacha prison in Casablanca.  The U.S.-based Committee to Protect Journalists and the Europe-based Bertha Foundation, a human rights group, reported that Radi’s arrest interrupted an investigation he was conducting, with funding from Bertha, on corrupt land expropriations in Morocco. Moroccan authorities held a 15-minute hearing on Radi’s case on December 24, 2020, and he remained imprisoned thereafter. 

In March 2022, Omar Radi was sentenced on appeal to six years in prison in a double case of espionage and rape. The sentence is accompanied by compensation of 200,000 dirhams in favor of the civil party.

See also
Hajar Raissouni
Aboubakr Jamaï
Ali Anouzla
Ahmed Benchemsi
Soulaimane Raissouni

References

Moroccan male journalists
Moroccan writers
Living people
1986 births
Imprisoned journalists
Moroccan prisoners and detainees
People from Kenitra
Moroccan activists